The 2nd constituency of Zala County is one of the single member constituencies of the National Assembly, the national legislature of Hungary. The constituency standard abbreviation: Zala 02. OEVK.

Since 2014, it has been represented by Jenő Manninger of the Fidesz–KDNP party alliance.

Geography
The 2nd constituency is located in north-eastern part of Zala County.

List of municipalities
The constituency includes the following municipalities:

Members
The constituency was first represented by Jenő Manninger of the Fidesz from 2014, and he was re-elected in 2018.

References

Zala 2nd